Stigmella variella is a moth of the family Nepticulidae. It is found in the United States in California and Arizona.

The wingspan is 5.5-7.5 mm. There are two to three generations per year in California. Completed mines can be found from July to early September and February to April.

The larvae feed on Quercus agrifolia, Quercus wislizeni and Quercus kelloggii. They mine the leaves of their host plant. The mine is serpentine and located in the upper epidermis and mesophyll. It becomes contorted and almost completely filled with frass granules, but no terminal blotch is formed.

External links
Nepticulidae of North America
A taxonomic revision of the North American species of Stigmella (Lepidoptera: Nepticulidae)

Nepticulidae
Moths of North America
Fauna of the California chaparral and woodlands
Moths described in 1910